Archibald Finley Withrow (January 19, 1848 – April 4, 1927) was an American Democratic politician who served as a member of the Virginia House of Delegates.

References

External links
 
 

1848 births
1927 deaths
Democratic Party members of the Virginia House of Delegates